Skeleton Crew is a play written by Dominique Morisseau about an auto factory on the brink of closure in 2008 Detroit, Michigan. It is the third part of Morisseau's Detroit Project, inspired by African-American playwrights, which also includes Paradise Blue and Detroit '67.

Productions
Skeleton Crew ran Off-Broadway at the Atlantic Theater Company in 2016 and subsequently at the Detroit Public Theatre in 2017. The Atlantic production was also directed by Santiago-Hudson.

It ran on Broadway as a limited-run engagement at Manhattan Theatre Club's Samuel J. Friedman Theatre from December 2021 through February 2022 under the direction of Ruben Santiago-Hudson and starred Phylicia Rashad as Faye. It was one of a series of Broadway shows in the 2021–2022 season written by Black playwrights, and parallels were identified between the play's story and the Omicron surge under which its run fell.

Awards and nominations

Original off-Broadway production

Original Broadway production

References

External links
 
 
 

Off-Broadway plays
Broadway plays
Tony Award-winning plays
Plays set in Michigan
Plays set in the 21st century